Eka Renaka Kurullo is a 2019 Sri Lankan Sinhala children's thriller film directed by Benadick Manthrige and produced by Udayanga Bandara for UB Films. It stars new cast of child actors Dulap Chamara, Sadipa Lakshani, Mark Devon and Pathum Blakshan in lead roles along with Cletus Mendis, Tharuka Wanniarachchi and Shashiranga Wickramasooriya in supportive roles. Music co-composed by Nimal Gunasekara and Nirosh Dissanayake.

The film was shot in and around Dambulla, Gampaha and Wattala areas. The film was released on 3 August 2019 in LFD cinemas.

Plot

Cast
 Cletus Mendis as Police officer
 Sunil Liyanarachchi as Rajamanthri
 Milinda Perera as Racketeer
 Austin Samarawickrama
 Tharuka Wanniarachchi as School teacher
 Shashiranga Wickramasooriya as School teacher
 Priyangani Kekuluwela as Maali
 Udayangani Bandara
 Dayaratne Siriwardena
 Arjun Liyanage
 Lal Sarath Kumara as Farmer
 Pradeepa Pathirana
 Keerthi Ranjith Peiris

Child characters
 Dulap Chamara
 Sadipa Lakshani
 Mark Devon
 Pathum Blakshan

Songs
The film consist with two songs.

References

External links
 
 Trailer of Eka Rene Kurullo on YouTube

2019 films
2010s Sinhala-language films